Stalter is a German language habitational surname and a variant of the surname Stalder. Notable people with the name include:
 Bernard Stalter (1957–2020), French entrepreneur and politician
 Joël Stalter (1992), French professional golfer
 Megan Stalter (1990), American comedian
 Pavao Štalter (1929–2021), Croatian animator, director, screenwriter, scenographer and artist

References 

German-language surnames
German toponymic surnames